Brachynillus is a genus of beetles in the family Carabidae, containing the following species:

 Brachynillus natalensis Basilewsky, 1988
 Brachynillus pallidus (Peringuey, 1896)
 Brachynillus varendorffi Reitter, 1904

References

Brachininae